Rufino is a city in the province of Santa Fe, Argentina. It lies on the southwest of the province,  from the main metropolitan area of the province Greater Rosario, from the provincial capital Santa Fe, near the borders with Córdoba (west) and Buenos Aires (south), on the intersection of National Routes 33 and 7.

The town was founded by Gerónimo Segundo Rufino in 1886, as the railway line that linked Diego de Alvear, Santa Fe, to Villa Mercedes, San Luis, was inaugurated. The plans for the new town were approved by the governorship of Santa Fe on 29 March 1889, which is acknowledged as the  official foundation date.

Notable people born in Rufino

 Guillermo Coria, tennis player
 Miguel Rolando Covian, biomedical scientist
 Amadeo Carrizo, soccer player
 Ernesto Mastrángelo, soccer player
 Jorge Rajadell, Artist
 Bernabé Ferreyra, soccer player
 Carlos Bulgheroni, businessman in Argentina's energy sector
 Federico Sturzenegger
 Santiago Chocobares, rugby player

References

 Municipality of Rufino — Official website.
 
 

Populated places in Santa Fe Province
Populated places established in 1886
Cities in Argentina
Argentina
Santa Fe Province